Antennaria microphylla (littleleaf pussytoes, rosy pussytoes, pink pussytoes, small pussytoes, dwarf everlasting) is a stoloniferous perennial forb in the family Asteraceae. It is widespread across northern and western North America, from Alaska and the three Canadian Arctic territories east to Quebec and south to Minnesota, New Mexico, and California.

Antennaria microphylla can be found growing in plains, hills, dry meadow, and open wood habitats. It is a small herb with male and female flowers on separate plants. The Columbian ground squirrel feeds on Litteleaf pussytoes.

References

microphylla
Plants described in 1897
Flora of Subarctic America
Flora of Canada
Flora of the Northwestern United States
Flora of the North-Central United States
Flora of the Southwestern United States
Flora of the South-Central United States
Flora without expected TNC conservation status